Incilius leucomyos is a species of toad in the family Bufonidae. It was described in 2000 and is endemic to the Atlantic versant of the north-central Honduras.

Description
Adult males measure  and females  in snout–vent length. The body is robust and the head is slightly wider than it is long.
The snout is nearly rounded but has a protruding tip in dorsal view. The tympanum is distinct but comparatively small. The canthal, supra-orbital, post-orbital, supra-tympanic, and parietal crests are all well-developed. The parotoid glands are sub-triangular. The limbs are relatively long. The fingers are long and slender and without enlarged tips and webbing. The toes are also long and slender but have some webbing. Skin is dorsally rugose and ventrally granular to strongly granular. The dorsal coloration is mostly yellow ocher but with buff mid-dorsal area. There is a rust-brown inter-ocular bar, rust-colored crests, and pale rust-colored post-ocular blotches.

Habitat and conservation
The tadpoles develop in streams. It is threatened by habitat loss caused by landslides (impacting streams) as well as from farming, logging, and human settlements. It occurs in some protected areas, including the La Muralla and Pico Bonito National Parks.

References

leucomyos
Amphibians described in 2000
Endemic fauna of Honduras
Amphibians of Honduras
Taxonomy articles created by Polbot